The 2020 Emilia Romagna Grand Prix (officially known as the Formula 1 Emirates Gran Premio dell'Emilia Romagna 2020) was a Formula One motor race which took place on 1 November 2020 at the Autodromo Internazionale Enzo e Dino Ferrari in Imola, Italy. It was the 28th Formula One race held at the Imola circuit, the first since 2006 and the first-ever running of a race there under the name of Emilia Romagna Grand Prix. The race was the 13th round of the 2020 Formula One World Championship.

The 63-lap race was won by Mercedes driver Lewis Hamilton, with his teammate Valtteri Bottas taking second place, and Renault driver Daniel Ricciardo taking the final podium place. With their drivers finishing first and second in the race, Mercedes secured the World Constructors' Championship, breaking the record for the most consecutive World Constructors' Championships, with seven.

Background
This was the 28th running of a Formula One event at Imola, the first time since the 2006 San Marino Grand Prix. Kimi Räikkönen was the only driver entered who had previously raced at the track in Formula One, having done so from the 2001 to the 2006 edition of the San Marino Grand Prix. The race weekend was held over two days rather than the traditional three days, hosting only one practice session of 90 minutes on Saturday morning before qualifying.

Impact of the COVID-19 pandemic 

The 2020 Formula One World Championship was heavily affected by the COVID-19 pandemic. Most of the originally planned Grands Prix were cancelled or postponed, prompting the FIA to draft a new calendar. The Emilia Romagna Grand Prix was not originally featured on the 2020 schedule, but was added in July 2020 in order to maximise the number of races in the season. Initially, 13,000 fans were expected to attend the race. However, due to a surge of cases attributed to the COVID-19 pandemic in the country, organisers announced that the Grand Prix would take place behind closed doors.

Entrants

Ten teams (each representing a different constructor) each entered two drivers. The drivers and teams were the same as those on the season entry list with no additional stand-in drivers for either the race or practice.

Tyres 

Sole Formula One tyre manufacturer Pirelli brought their C2, C3 and C4 compound tyres for teams to use in the race, the middle range of the five compounds available in terms of hardness.

Practice 
Lewis Hamilton finished the only practice session fastest ahead of Red Bull's Max Verstappen and the other Mercedes of Valtteri Bottas.

Qualifying 
Valtteri Bottas took pole by 0.097s ahead of his teammate Lewis Hamilton. Pierre Gasly's 4th place was Scuderia AlphaTauri's best qualifying result as a constructor and the best qualifying result for the team since the 2008 Italian Grand Prix when they competed as Scuderia Toro Rosso.

Qualifying classification

Race 

Valtteri Bottas initially led from pole while Max Verstappen passed Lewis Hamilton to move up from 3rd into 2nd at the start. On the second lap Bottas hit some debris on the track which damaged his car, slowing his progress for the remainder of the race. Daniel Ricciardo overtook Pierre Gasly at the start to move up into fourth place, only for Gasly to retire from the race in the early stages with a coolant leak.

Bottas and Verstappen pitted for new tyres earlier in the race. Hamilton pitted during a virtual safety car meaning the pitstop cost him less time than his rivals, allowing him to lead the race after the first round of pitstops. Verstappen eventually passed Bottas, only for a tyre failure to cause his car to leave the track and get beached in the gravel trap at the Villeneuve chicane. This brought out a safety car and bunched up the field for the final few laps of the race.

During the safety car period George Russell, who had been running in 10th, spun and crashed his Williams car into a wall between Piratella and Aqua Minerale whilst trying to warm his tyres. After the safety car restart Daniil Kvyat moved up several positions into fourth place whilst Alex Albon spun from fifth and dropped to the back. Ricciardo inherited third place behind the two Mercedes drivers after Sergio Pérez pitted for new tyres behind the safety car.

Race classification 

 Notes
  – Includes one point for fastest lap.
  – Romain Grosjean finished 12th on the track, but received a five-second time penalty for exceeding track limits.

Championship standings after the race

Drivers' Championship standings

Constructors' Championship standings

 Note: Only the top five positions are included for both sets of standings.
 Competitors marked with an asterisk still had a mathematical chance of winning the Championship.

Notes

References

External links 

Emilia Romagna
Emilia Romagna Grand Prix
Emilia Romagna Grand Prix
Emilia Romagna Grand Prix
Emilia Romagna Grand Prix